Following is a list of notable architects from New Zealand.

Individuals

A
 William (Bill) Alington (born 1929)
 Edmund Anscombe (1874–1948) 
 William Armson (1832/3–1883)
 Ian Athfield (1940–2015)

B
 Joseph Barton (1853–1917)
 Edward Bartley (1839–1919)
 Kate Beath (1882–1979)
 Peter Beaven (1925–2012)
 Roy Keith Binney (1886–1957)
 Louis Boldini (1832–1908)
 Pete Bossley (born 1950)
 Vernon Brown (1905–1965)
 John Arthur Burnside (1856–1920)
 Maxwell Bury (1825–1912)

C
 Thomas Bedford Cameron (c.1837–1894)
 John Campbell (1857–1942)
 James Chapman-Taylor (1878–1958)
 Pip Cheshire (born 1950)
 Lillian Chrystall (1926–2022)
 William Clayton (1823–1877)
 Frederick de Jersey Clere (1856–1952)
 Amyas Connell (1901–1980)
 Marshall Cook
 Leslie Douglas Coombs (1885–1952)

D
 Tibor Donner (1907–1993)
 William Henry Dunning (1872–1933)

F
 Samuel Farr (1827–1918)
 Robert Forrest (–1919)
 Roy Henderson Fraser (1895–1972)

G
 George Selwyn Goldsbro' (1870-?)
 William Henry Gummer (1884–1966)

H
 Louis Hay (1881–1948)
 William Alfred Holman (1864–1949) 
 Len Hoogerbrug (1929–2019)
 Basil Bramston Hooper (1876–1960)

K
 Henry Kulka (1900–1971)

L
 Robert Lawson (1833–1902)
 Isaac Luck (1817–1881)

M
 Joseph Maddison (1850–1923)
 Harry Mandeno (1879–1972)
 Jack Manning (1929–2021)
 William Mason (1810–1897)
 Horace Massey (1895–1978) 
 Ted McCoy (1925–2018)
 David Mitchell (1941–2018)
 Chris Moller
 Gordon Moller
 Benjamin Mountfort (1825–1898)

N
 Richard Naish (born 1968)

P
 Paul Pascoe (1908–1976)
 Andrew Patterson (born 1960)
 Francis Petre (1847–1918)

S
 James Louis Salmond (1868–1950)
 John Scott (1924–1992)
 Henry McDowell Smith (1887–1965)
 John Sydney Swan (1874–1936)

T
 Frederick Thatcher (1814–1890) 
 Richard Toy (1911–1995) 
 George Troup (1863–1941)

W
 Nathaniel Wales (1832–1903)
 Robert Newton Vanes (1883–1961)
 Roger Walker (born 1942)
 Miles Warren (born 1929) 
 Gordon Wilson (1900–1959)

Y
 W. Gray Young (1885–1962)

Firms
 Armson, Collins and Harman
 Gummer and Ford
 Hoggard, Prouse and Gummer
 E. Mahoney and Son
 Mason & Wales
 Warren and Mahoney

See also

 Architecture of New Zealand
 List of architects
 List of New Zealanders

References

External links
New Zealand Architects Register

New Zealand
Architects